Mink Peak is a prominent peak standing  north of Cleveland Mesa, at the east end of the Watson Escarpment in Antarctica. It was mapped by the United States Geological Survey from surveys and U.S. Navy air photos, 1960–64, and was named by the Advisory Committee on Antarctic Names for Harold D. Mink, a utilitiesman with the wintering parties at Byrd Station in 1962 and 1966.

References

External links

Mountains of Marie Byrd Land